Richard "Wolfie" Wolf is an American Emmy Award-winning film and television composer, multi-platinum-selling music producer, songwriter, remixer, and author.

Wolf got his start writing songs for his band and various artists before working for Warner/Chappell Music as staff songwriter. Soon after, he wrote and produced music for several feature films. He wrote the theme song for the Rodney Dangerfield film, Back To School and began contribute to many large film projects, most notably producing for Southside Johnny & The Asbury Jukes for the number one box office Karate Kid II and penning a song for the Madonna vehicle, Who's That Girl. In 1989 he teamed up with Brett "Epic" Mazur to form the production team Wolf & Epic.  Wolf & Epic were among the first record makers to break down the barriers between R&B, Hip-hop & Pop at the beginning of the 1990s. During this time, Wolf worked on projects for artists such as MC Lyte, Prince, Seal, New Kids on the Block, Nona Gaye, Coolio, New Edition, Sheena Easton, Laquan and Bell Biv Devoe.  Bell Biv Devoe's début album Poison and remix album WBBD-Bootcity both featured Wolf's production, and were certified triple Platinum and Gold respectively. Acid Jazz was another new fusion of musical styles which Wolf & Epic helped pioneer with their work on the first Acid Jazz compilation The Rebirth of the Cool Vol.1 (Island Records).

In the twenty-first century Wolf's focus turned back to producing and composing for visual media. His score for the Warner Bros. cartoon Static Shock shook up Saturday morning programming with its fusion of hip-hop, electronic and traditional score, for which it was recognized with two Daytime Emmy nominations in 2003 and 2004 and one win. His work has appeared in hundreds of television episodes and films including Big Bang Theory, Nashville, Oprah, Criminal Minds, America's Next Top Model, Bojack Horseman, CBS Sports, NASCAR, and twelve seasons of the worldwide hit, NCIS. Wolf is currently on the faculty of the University of Southern California's Thornton School of Music where he teaches classes on music in media and culture, and the special relationship between musical practice and mindfulness practice. His book "In Tune: Music As The Bridge To Mindfuless" charts twelve "bridges"—skills and sensibilities refined in musical practice that carry over to mindfulness and meditation. The New Yorker refers to this book as "a manual for achieving calm in a tumultuous world". Wolf also works with a diversity of charities and is a board member of the I Have A Dream Foundation.

Musician
Wolf, a Manhattan native, signed his first record deal, with Quinn Ivy Studios in Muscle Shoals, Alabama, while still a freshman in college. Wolf then signed as a staff songwriter with Warner/Chappell Music.
While there, he worked on various film and television projects, and artists including Steve Cropper, Angela Bofill, Johnny Gill and Toni Basil covered his songs.

Record producer and songwriter
In 1989 Wolf teamed up with his former studio intern Brett "Epic" Mazur to form what major west coast artist manager Jerry Heller (of N.W.A and Eazy-E) would describe as "the hottest producing team of the early 1990s:" Wolf & Epic (initially named Peace Productions). Wolf's vision was to record live the type of funk and R&B that was commonly sampled by hip hop producers and then overlay scratching and other hip hop techniques to give it a new dimension. Wolf played guitar and keyboards, Mazur played drums and deejayed, and other musicians were brought in to fatten the sound.  Mazur praised his older counterpart as having "the knack to come up with that undeniable hook.  Even if it's just a keyboard part, he goes beyond just a chorus".

The two musicians used the generation gap to their advantage and were able to span several genres and styles in their acclaimed productions.

Wolf & Epic's first project together was with Laquan on his album Notes of a Native Son.  This record was one of the first to combine a live band with hip hop scratching, sampling, and rapping. The New York Times praised Laquan, saying that listening to his music is "to hear the shape of urban debates to come" and admired the "slick pop choruses [that] buoy his songs". One of the tracks was included on the compilation The Rebirth of the Cool Vol. 1 (Island Records), which spawned a string of albums that pioneered the "Acid Jazz" movement of jazzy hip hop.  The duo later wrote and recorded another acid jazz hit, "Eyes of the Soul," on MC Lyte's Atlantic Records album Act Like You Know.

In the early 1990s, Wolf & Epic, along with other producers, worked on Bell Biv Devoe's album, Poison: a triple-platinum album that pioneered the fusion of soul and hip hop.  Wolf & Epic, who had a No. 1 hit with their remixed version of Bell Biv Devoe's "Do Me", went on to "use the finished record as raw material... [to] completely re-produce it". The result was WBBD-Bootcity!: The Remix Album, the chart topping, certified gold album of Bell Biv Devoe remixes that sealed Wolf & Epic's reputation as "the hot new kids on the remixing block".

Some of Wolf's other notable projects during this time include work on Ralph Tresvant's "Public Figure," Sheena Easton's "You Can Swing It", remixes of Prince's "Horny Pony" and Seal's "Crazy", and work with the New Kids on the Block and Nona Gaye.

After Wolf and Mazur amicably parted ways, Wolf continued to write, produce, and remix records with artists including Freddie Mercury, Coolio, CeCe Peniston ("I Will Be Received"), MC Lyte, Ricky Bell, and Johnny Gill.

Film music production and composition
Most recently, a song that Wolf co-wrote was placed in the Robocop remake released in 2014. Wolf broke into the film industry when he co-wrote and produced several songs (including the title song) for Rodney Dangerfield's film, Back to School, in 1985. After that project, Wolf wrote and produced music for several more major film projects including  The Karate Kid, Part II and Madonna's Who's That Girl. Wolf's work on Scooby-Doo and the Cyber Chase marked his entry into composing for animated stories.  The film-makers wanted to move Scooby Doo into the new century, which Wolf fully embraced. Wolf's other film credits include Strictly Business, starring Halle Berry and débuting Mary J. Blige; Three Kings, where Wolf worked with director David O. Russell and actor Mark Wahlberg; and the Harrison Ford drama Presumed Innocent.

Emmy winning television music production and composition
Over the span of nearly two decades, Wolf's musical creations have been featured in thousands of television episodes including top rated shows such NCIS, NCIS: Los Angeles, The Good Wife, ER, The X-Files, Fox Sports and ABC News' 20/20.

Wolf's introduction to branding music for television came when Fox asked him to write original music for its Health Net cable.  Then in 1999, he was asked to write original themes and identification music for the Fox Sports Network. The Hollywood Reporter explained, "it's his job to come up with two-minutes pieces of music that are flexible enough to work with sports as diverse as golf and beach volleyball, and distinctive enough to work as a branding device for the network". Since 1999, Fox has used Wolf's themes for almost two dozen network sports programs.  The wide variety of Fox Sports themes & underscore cues that Wolf has composed have been played on thousands of sports broadcasts ranging from Major League Baseball, NASCAR and NFL to women's volleyball and golf.

Wolf's animation experience from Scooby-Doo and the Cyber Chase project led to his job composing for the Warner Bros. top rated Saturday morning show Static Shock — a project that would earn him various awards.  "The beauty of doing a show like this is that you can draw on a broad spectrum of styles," Wolf says, "Superhero animation tends to be music-driven, and it can be a virtual playground for composers... The breadth of creative self-expression is truly liberating, especially after coming from the field of record production, where you're invariably pigeonholed into a single genre". The score combined hip-hop and electronica with a traditional orchestration and brought an edgy urban soundtrack to Saturday morning cartoons. The National Academy of Television Arts and Sciences recognized the originality of the score by awarding Wolf Daytime Emmy nominations two years in a row and as well as an Emmy Award for Outstanding Music Composition and Direction in 2004.

Another one of Wolf's impressive television credits comes from Tyra Banks' hit television series, America's Next Top Model. For over fourteen seasons the show has relied heavily on Wolf's original music for everything from hip-hop tunes to themes for judging and elimination sequences. In 2008, a special issue of The Hollywood Reporter honored the 100th episode of ANTM and cited Wolf's musical contributions, explaining how the "music elevates the drama among competitors".

Working from his boutique music production and publishing company, The Producers Lab, Inc., Wolf continues to write and produce music for long time projects such as NCIS, 20/20 News, Fox Sports, ABC News, and ANTM as well as a variety of others.

Author and educator 
Wolf is on the faculty of the University of Southern California's Thornton School of Music where he teaches classes on music in media and culture, and the special relationship between musical practice and mindfulness practice. His book "In Tune: Music As The Bridge To Mindfuless" charts twelve "bridges"—skills and sensibilities refined in musical practice that carry over to mindfulness and meditation. The book has been positively reviewed by Mindful magazine, The New Yorker, Publishers Weekly, and more, and became the No. 1 new release in its category on Amazon.

Discography

References

External links

 
 

Living people
American male songwriters
American record producers
American film score composers
Remixers
Year of birth missing (living people)